The following is a summary of the 2020–21 season of competitive football in Switzerland.

National teams

Men's national team

2020–21 UEFA Nations League

2020–21 UEFA Nations League A

2022 FIFA World Cup qualification

UEFA Euro 2020

Friendly matches

Women's national team

UEFA Women's Euro 2022 qualifying

UEFA Women's Euro 2022 qualifying, group stage

UEFA Women's Euro 2022 qualifying, play-off round

2–2 on aggregate. Switzerland won 3–2 on penalties and qualified for UEFA Women's Euro 2022.

Friendly matches

League season

Men

Raiffeisen Super League

Brack.ch Challenge League

Swiss Cup

Women

AXA Women's Super League

AXA Women's Cup

Swiss clubs in Europe

UEFA Champions League

Qualifying phase and play-off round

Second qualifying round

|}

Play-off round

|}

UEFA Europa League

Qualifying phase and play-off round

First qualifying round

|}

Second qualifying round

|}

Third qualifying round

|}

Play-off round

|}

Group stage

Group A

Knockout phase

Round of 32

|}

Round of 16

|}

UEFA Women's Champions League

Knockout phase

Round of 32

|}

Notes

References

 
Seasons in Swiss football